The Central Bureau of Statistics (CBS) is the statistical agency responsible for the gathering of "information relating to economic, social and general activities and conditions" in the Syrian Arab Republic. The office is answerable to the office of the Prime Minister and has its main offices in Damascus. The CBS was established in 2005 and is administered by an administrative council headed by the deputy prime minister for economic affairs.

After the Syrian government began reconstructing infrastructure in 2011, the bureau began releasing data from 2011 to 2018.

References

External links
  

Government of Syria
Syria
Government agencies established in 2005
2005 establishments in Syria